Whitworth railway station served the town of Whitworth, Rossendale, Lancashire, England, from 1870 until closure in 1947.

References

Lost Railways of Lancashire by Gordon Suggitt

Disused railway stations in the Borough of Rossendale
Former Lancashire and Yorkshire Railway stations
Railway stations in Great Britain opened in 1870
Railway stations in Great Britain closed in 1947